Mildred Ella "Babe" Didrikson Zaharias (Didrikson; June 26, 1911 – September 27, 1956) was an American athlete who excelled in golf, basketball, baseball and track and field. She won two gold medals in track and field at the 1932 Summer Olympics, before turning to professional golf and winning 10 LPGA major championships.

Biography
Mildred Ella Didrikson was born on June 26, 1911, the sixth of seven children, in the coastal city of Port Arthur, Texas. Her mother, Hannah, and her father, Ole Didriksen, were immigrants from Norway. Although her three eldest siblings were born in Norway, Babe and her three other siblings were born in Port Arthur. She later changed the spelling of her surname from Didriksen to Didrikson. She moved with her family to 850 Doucette in Beaumont, Texas, at age 4. She claimed to have acquired the nickname "Babe" (after Babe Ruth) upon hitting five home runs in a childhood baseball game, but her Norwegian mother had called her "Bebe" from the time she was a toddler.

Though best known for her athletic gifts, Didrikson had many talents. She also competed in sewing. An excellent seamstress, she made many of her clothes, including her golfing outfits. She claimed to have won the sewing championship at the 1931 State Fair of Texas in Dallas; she did win the South Texas State Fair in Beaumont, embellishing the story many years later in 1953. She attended Beaumont High School. Never a strong student, she was forced to repeat the eighth grade and was a year older than her classmates. She eventually dropped out without graduating after she moved to Dallas to play basketball. She was a singer and a harmonica player and recorded several songs on the Mercury Records label. Her biggest seller was "I Felt a Little Teardrop" with "Detour" on the flip side.

Already famous as Babe Didrikson, she married George Zaharias (1908–1984), a professional wrestler, in St. Louis, Missouri, on December 23, 1938. Thereafter, she was largely known as Babe Didrikson Zaharias or Babe Zaharias. The two met while playing golf. George Zaharias, a Greek American, was a native of Pueblo, Colorado. Called the "Crying Greek from Cripple Creek", Zaharias also did some part-time acting, appearing in the 1952 movie Pat and Mike. The Zahariases had no children. They were rebuffed by authorities when they sought to adopt.

Athletic achievements
Didrikson gained world fame in track and field and All-American status in basketball. She played organized baseball and softball and was an expert diver, roller-skater, and bowler.

AAU champion
Didrikson's first job after high school was as a secretary for the Employers' Casualty Insurance Company of Dallas, though she was employed only in order to play basketball as an amateur on the company's "industrial team", the Golden Cyclones. As a side note, the competition was then governed by the Amateur Athletic Union (AAU). Despite leading the team to an AAU Basketball Championship in 1931, Didrikson had first achieved wider attention as a track and field athlete.

Representing her company in the 1932 AAU Championships, she competed in eight out of ten events, winning five outright, and tying for first in a sixth. Didrikson's performances were enough to win the team championship, despite her being the sole member of her team.

1932 Olympics
Didrikson set four world records, winning two gold medals and one silver medal for track and field in the 1932 Los Angeles Olympics. In the 80-meter hurdles, she equaled the world record of 11.8 seconds in her opening heat. In the final, she broke her record with an 11.7 clocking, taking gold. In the javelin, she also won gold with an Olympic record throw of 43.69 meters. Shiley was awarded the gold after Didrikson was ruled to have used an improper technique. She did not compete in the discus throw, as fellow American Lillian Copeland beat her out in the Olympic trials; Copeland went on to win the gold medal in discus.

Didrikson is the only track and field athlete, male or female, to win individual Olympic medals in separate running, throwing and jumping events.

Post-Olympics
In the following years, she performed on the vaudeville circuit, traveled with teams like Babe Didrikson's All-Americans basketball team and the bearded House of David (commune) team. Didrikson was also a competitive pocket billiards (pool) player, though not a champion. She was noted in the January 1933 press for playing (and badly losing) a multi-day straight pool match in New York City against famed female  Ruth McGinnis.

Golf

By 1935, Didrikson began to play golf, a latecomer to the sport in which she became best known. Shortly thereafter, she was denied amateur status, and so, in January 1938, she competed in the Los Angeles Open, a PGA (Professional Golfers' Association) tournament. No other woman competed against men in this tournament until Annika Sörenstam, Suzy Whaley, Michelle Wie and Brittany Lincicome almost six decades later. She shot 81 and 84, and missed the cut. In the tournament, she was teamed with George Zaharias. They were married eleven months later, and settled in Tampa, Florida, on the premises of a golf course that they purchased in 1951.

Didrikson became America's first female golf celebrity and the leading player of the 1940s and early 1950s. In order to regain amateur status in the sport, she could compete in no other sports for three years. She gained back her amateur status in 1942. In 1945, she had participated in three more PGA Tour events, missing the second cut of the first of them, and making the cut of the other two; as of 2018, she remains the only woman to have achieved this. Zaharias won the 1946 U.S. Women's Amateur and the 1947 British Ladies Amateur – the first American to do so – and three Women's Western Opens. Having formally turned professional in 1947, Didrikson dominated the Women's Professional Golf Association and later the Ladies Professional Golf Association. She was a founding member of the Ladies Professional Golf Association, in 1950. Serious illness ended her career in the mid-1950s.

Zaharias won a tournament named after her, the Babe Zaharias Open of her hometown of Beaumont, Texas. She won the 1947 Titleholders Championship and the 1948 U.S. Women's Open for her fourth and fifth major championships. She won 17 straight women's amateur victories, a feat never equaled by anyone. By 1950, she had won every golf title available. Totaling both her amateur and professional victories, Zaharias won a total of 82 golf tournaments.

Charles McGrath of The New York Times wrote of Zaharias, "Except perhaps for Arnold Palmer, no golfer has ever been more beloved by the gallery."

Golf awards
While Zaharias missed the cut in the 1938 PGA Tour event, later, as she became more experienced, she made the cut in every PGA Tour event she entered. In January 1945, Zaharias played in three PGA tournaments. She shot 76–76 to qualify for the Los Angeles Open. She then shot 76–81 to make the two-day cut in the tournament itself, but missed the three-day cut after a 79, making her the first (and currently only) woman in history to make the cut in a regular PGA Tour event. She continued her cut streak at the Phoenix Open, where she shot 77-72-75-80, finishing in 33rd place. At the Tucson Open, she qualified by shooting 74-81 and then shot a 307 in the tournament and finished tied for 42nd. Unlike other female golfers competing in men's events, she got into the Los Angeles and Tucson Opens through 36-hole qualifiers, as opposed to a sponsor's exemption.

In 1948, she became the first woman to attempt to qualify for the U.S. Open, but her application was rejected by the USGA. They stated that the event was intended to be open to men only.

Baseball
In March 1934, Didrikson pitched a total of four innings in three Major League spring training exhibition games:
 On March 20 she gave up one walk and no hits in one inning for the Philadelphia Athletics against the Brooklyn Dodgers.
 On March 22 she pitched the first inning for the St. Louis Cardinals against the Boston Red Sox. It was reported that "Under tutelage of Burleigh Grimes, Dizzy Dean, and others she has learned to stand on the rubber, wind up like a big leaguer and throw a rather fair curve." The Red Sox scored three runs against Didrikson in the inning before she got Boston third baseman Bucky Walters to fly out to future Hall of Famer Joe Medwick in left field to end the inning. She was relieved at the start of the second inning by Cardinal pitcher Bill Hallahan. 400 fans were in attendance.
 On March 25 she played for the New Orleans Pelicans against the Cleveland Indians, pitching two scoreless innings and lining out in her only plate appearance.

Didrikson also spent time with the House of David barnstorming team and is still recognized as the world record holder for the farthest baseball throw by a woman.

Last years and death
Zaharias had her greatest year in 1950 when she completed the Grand Slam of the three women's majors of the day: the U.S. Open, the Titleholders Championship, and the Women's Western Open, a feat that made her the leader on the money list that year. Also that year, she reached 10 wins faster than any other LPGA golfer, doing so in one year and 20 days, a record that still stands. She was the leading money-winner again in 1951, and in 1952 took another major with a Titleholders victory, but illness prevented her from playing a full schedule in 1952–53. This did not stop her from becoming the fastest player to reach 20 wins (two years and four months).

She was a close friend of fellow golfer Betty Dodd. According to Susan Cayleff's biography Babe, Dodd was quoted as saying, "I had such admiration for this fabulous person [Zaharias]. I loved her. I would have done anything for her." They met in a 1950 amateur golf tournament in Miami and became close almost immediately. Cayleff wrote, "As Didrikson's marriage grew increasingly troubled, she spent more time with Dodd. The women toured together on the golf circuit, and eventually Dodd moved in with Zaharias and Didrikson for the last six years of Didrikson's life." They never used the word "lesbian" to describe their relationship, but there is little doubt that their relationship was both sexual and romantic, and Zaharias has been described as the first lesbian gold medallist in Olympic athletics.

In 1953 Zaharias was diagnosed with colon cancer. After undergoing surgery, she made a comeback in 1954. She took the Vare Trophy for lowest scoring average, her only win of that trophy, and her 10th and final major with a U.S. Women's Open championship, one month after the surgery and while wearing a colostomy bag. With this win, she became the second-oldest woman to win a major LPGA championship tournament (behind Fay Crocker). Babe Zaharias now stands third to Crocker and Sherri Steinhauer. These wins made her the fastest player to reach 30 wins (five years and 22 days). In addition to continuing tournament play, Zaharias also served as the president of the LPGA from August 1952 to July 1955.

Her colon cancer recurred in 1955. Despite her limited schedule of eight golfing events that season, Zaharias won her last two tournaments in competitive golf. On September 27, 1956, Zaharias died of her illness at the age of forty-five at the John Sealy Hospital in Galveston, Texas. At the time of her death, she was still a top-ranked female golfer. She and her husband had earlier established the Babe Zaharias Fund to support cancer clinics. She is buried at Forest Lawn Cemetery in her hometown of Beaumont, Texas.

During her final years, Didrikson became known not only for her athletic abilities but as a public advocate for cancer awareness, at a time when many Americans refused to seek diagnosis or treatment for suspected cancer. She used her fame to solicit donations for her cancer fund but also as a spokesperson for the American Cancer Society. Her work in this area was honored by US President Dwight Eisenhower on a visit to the White House.

Legacy
She was named the 10th Greatest North American Athlete of the 20th Century by ESPN, being the highest-ranked woman on their list.

Zaharias broke the accepted models of femininity in her time, including the accepted models of female athleticism. Although a sports hero to many, she was also derided for her "manliness".

Zaharias was inducted into the LPGA Hall of Fame in 1951 (now part of the World Golf Hall of Fame). In 1957, she posthumously received the Bob Jones Award, the highest honor given by the United States Golf Association in recognition of distinguished sportsmanship in golf. It was accepted by her husband George, four months after her death. She was one of six initial inductees into the LPGA Hall of Fame at its inception in 1977.

Zaharias has a museum dedicated to her in Beaumont, Texas the Babe Didrikson Zaharias Museum. Several golf courses are named after her. A Tampa, Florida golf course that she and her husband owned, the Babe Zaharias Golf Course, was given landmark status.

In 1973, Zaharias, who had lived in the Denver area for most of the 1940s and early 1950s, became one of the three inductees in the inaugural class (joining Dave Hill and Babe Lind) of the Colorado Golf Hall of Fame.

In 1976, Zaharias was inducted into the National Women's Hall of Fame.

In 1981, the U.S. Postal Service issued an 18 cent stamp commemorating Zaharias. In 2008, Zaharias was inducted into the Colorado Women's Hall of Fame.

On January 7, 2021, Zaharias was awarded the Presidential Medal of Freedom by President Donald J. Trump.

Contemporary impressions

Williams' remark typified the attitude of some toward women who did not fit the traditional ideals of femininity current in the first half of the 20th century. However, in the same time period, the Associated Press chose her as the "Female Athlete of the Year" six times for track & field and for golfing, and, in 1950, overwhelmingly voted for her as the "Greatest Female Athlete of the First Half of the Century". Aside from her impact on the women and girls of her time, she impressed seasoned sportswriters also:

Modern-day
The Associated Press followed up its 1950 declaration fifty years later by voting Zaharias the Woman Athlete of the 20th Century in 1999. In 2000, Sports Illustrated magazine also named her second on its list of the Greatest Female Athletes of All Time, behind the heptathlete Jackie Joyner-Kersee. She is also in the World Golf Hall of Fame. Zaharias is the highest-ranked woman, at No. 10, on ESPN's list of the 50 top athletes of the 20th century. In 2000, she was ranked as the 17th-greatest golfer, and the second-greatest woman player (after Mickey Wright) by Golf Digest magazine.

Zaharias wrote an autobiography This Life I've Led. It is no longer in print but is available in many libraries.

In 1975, the film Babe, based on Zaharias' life, was released, with Susan Clark playing the lead role (for which Clark would win an Emmy Award). Alex Karras played George Zaharias. Clark and Karras met while making the picture and later married.

In 2014, Zaharias was inducted into the Legacy Walk, an outdoor public display that celebrates LGBT history and people.

She was inducted into the Texas Track and Field Coaches Hall of Fame, Class of 2016.

Babe Zaharias Golf Course
In 1949, Zaharias purchased a golf course in the Forest Hills area of Tampa and lived nearby. After her death, the golf course was sold. It lay dormant as developers attempted to acquire the land for residential housing.

In 1974, the City of Tampa took over the golf course, renovated it, and reopened it, naming it the Babe Zaharias Golf Course. At some point afterward, it was accorded historical-landmark status.

California course
In 1980, the Industry Hills Golf Club at Pacific Palms Resort in City of Industry, California built two courses, The Ike and The Zaharias. The courses were designed by William F. Bell (original design) and Casey O'Callaghan (renovation). In 2010, the courses together won the National Golf Course Owners Association's California Golf Course of the Year Award.

In the media

 Dodge featured Babe Didrikson in advertisements for the 1933 Dodge "6" sedan.
 Zaharias appeared as a guest on the ABC reality show, The Comeback Story (1953–1954), explaining her attempts to battle colon cancer, which thereafter still claimed her life.
 In 1952, she appeared as herself in the Spencer Tracy-Katharine Hepburn film Pat and Mike.
 In 1975, Susan Clark portrayed Zaharias in a biographic TV movie titled Babe.
 The 1987 science fiction novel Countersolar! by Richard A. Lupoff featured Zaharias as a character serving as part of an interplanetary expedition alongside Josh Gibson and Albert Einstein on a spacecraft built by Jack Northrop.
 In Jenifer Levin's 1993 novel The Sea of Light, main character Mildred "Babe" Delgado is named after Zaharias by her mother Barbara, who considered Zaharias to be "my only hero".
 In 2007, Carolyn Gage began work on Babe, a full-chorus, full-orchestra musical about Zaharias.
 In June 2011, Little, Brown published a major biography of Zaharias, Wonder Girl, by author Don Van Natta Jr.
 Family Guy has made numerous references to Babe Zaharias being one of the greatest Americans to have lived.
 In season 21 of The Simpsons, Marge dresses up as Zaharias for her Charity Chicks calendar with a history theme. Marge also refers to her as the female Tiger Woods of the 20th century.
 On August 26, 2014, her story was portrayed in a "Sport Heroes" episode of the Comedy Central series Drunk History; Didrikson Zaharias was played by Emily Deschanel.

Amateur wins
Note: This list is incomplete.
1935 Texas Women's Amateur
1946 U.S. Women's Amateur, Women's Trans-Mississippi Amateur
1947 North and South Women's Amateur, British Ladies Amateur

Professional wins

LPGA Tour wins (41)
1940 (1) Women's Western Open (as an amateur)
1944 (1) Women's Western Open (as an amateur)
1945 (1) Women's Western Open (as an amateur)
1947 (2) Tampa Open, Titleholders Championship (as an amateur)
1948 (3) All American Open, World Championship, U.S. Women's Open
1949 (2) World Championship, Eastern Open
1950 (8) Titleholders Championship, Pebble Beach Weathervane, Cleveland Weathervane, 144 Hole Weathervane, Women's Western Open, All American Open, World Championship, U.S. Women's Open
1951 (9) Ponte Verde Beach Women's Open, Tampa Women's Open, Lakewood Weathervane, Richmond Women's Open, Valley Open, Meridian Hills Weathervane, All American Open, World Championship, Women's Texas Open
1952 (5) Miami Weathervane, Titleholders Championship, Bakersfield Open (tied with Marlene Hagge, Betty Jameson and Betsy Rawls), Fresno Open, Women's Texas Open
1953 (2) Sarasota Open, Babe Zaharias Open
1954 (5) Serbin Open, Sarasota Open, Damon Runyon Cancer Fund Tournament, U.S. Women's Open, All American Open
1955 (2) Tampa Open, Peach Blossom Open

LPGA Majors are shown in bold.

Other wins
1940 Women's Texas Open
1945 Women's Texas Open
1946 All American Open, Women's Texas Open
1947 Hardscrabble Open
1951 Orlando Florida 2-Ball (with George Bolesta)
1952 Orlando Mixed (with Al Besselink)

Major championships

Wins (10)

See also
List of golfers with most LPGA Tour wins
List of golfers with most LPGA major championship wins
Female golfers who have competed against men in open PGA tournaments:
Annika Sorenstam
Suzy Whaley
Michelle Wie
Brittany Lincicome

References

Bibliography

External links

 
 
 
 
 
 Babe Didrikson photos held by the Library of Congress
 Babe, a 1975 TV movie biography, at The Internet Movie Database
 
 "Babe Didrikson Zaharias's Legacy Fades", The New York Times, June 25, 2011
 Babe Didrikson Zaharias – Note: Although this is the official site of the Babe Didrikson Zaharias Foundation, this site once contained a number of notable factual errors that have since been corrected. For example, it stated that she won all of the events she entered at the 1932 Olympic games when in fact she won two of the three. It stated that she graduated from high school; she did not. And it stated that she did not smoke, which is also not true.
 Michals, Debra. "Mildred 'Babe' Zaharias". National Women's History Museum. 2015.

20th-century American non-fiction writers
20th-century American women writers
American autobiographers
American women's basketball players
American female golfers
American female high jumpers
American female hurdlers
American female javelin throwers
American people of Norwegian descent
Athletes (track and field) at the 1932 Summer Olympics
Baseball players from Dallas
Baseball players from Tampa, Florida
Basketball players from Dallas
Basketball players from Tampa, Florida
Bisexual sportspeople
Deaths from cancer in Texas
Deaths from colorectal cancer
Golfers from Dallas
Golfers from Tampa, Florida
LGBT golfers
LGBT baseball players
LGBT basketball players
LGBT people from Texas
American LGBT sportspeople
LGBT track and field athletes
LPGA Tour golfers
Medalists at the 1932 Summer Olympics
Olympic gold medalists for the United States in track and field
Olympic silver medalists for the United States in track and field
Presidential Medal of Freedom recipients
Sportspeople from Beaumont, Texas
Track and field athletes from Dallas
Track and field athletes from Florida
Sportspeople from Port Arthur, Texas
Winners of ladies' major amateur golf championships
Winners of LPGA major golf championships
Women autobiographers
World Golf Hall of Fame inductees
1911 births
1956 deaths
20th-century American LGBT people